Bugs Bunny's Looney Christmas Tales is a 1979 animated Christmas television special featuring Bugs Bunny and other Looney Tunes characters in three newly created cartoon shorts with seasonal themes. It premiered on CBS on November 27, 1979.

Voice cast 
 Mel Blanc as Bugs Bunny, Porky Pig, Foghorn Leghorn, Tweety Bird, Yosemite Sam, Wile E. Coyote and Road Runner, Tasmanian Devil, Speedy Gonzales, Santa Claus, and Airplane Pilots
 June Foray as Mrs. Claus and Clyde Bunny

New cartoons featured 
Three new cartoons appeared in the show:
Bugs Bunny's Christmas Carol (Friz Freleng)
Freeze Frame (Chuck Jones)
The Fright Before Christmas (Friz Freleng)

Home media 
It was released on the fifth volume of the Looney Tunes Golden Collection along with Bugs Bunny's Bustin' Out All Over and Bugs and Daffy's Carnival of the Animals.

See also 
 Bah, Humduck! A Looney Tunes Christmas
 List of Christmas films

References

External links 
 

1979 television specials
1970s American television specials
1970s American animated films
1970s animated television specials
1979 animated films
Animated television specials
CBS original programming
CBS television specials
Christmas television specials
Bugs Bunny films
Looney Tunes television specials
Television specials by DePatie–Freleng Enterprises
Television shows directed by Chuck Jones
American Christmas television specials
Animated Christmas television specials